The Sea Wolf is a 1930 American pre-Code drama film directed by Alfred Santell and written by S. N. Behrman and Ralph Block. The film stars Milton Sills, Jane Keithley, Raymond Hackett, Mitchell Harris, Nat Pendleton, and John Rogers. It is based on the 1904 novel The Sea-Wolf by Jack London. The film was released on September 21, 1930, by Fox Film Corporation.

Cast        
Milton Sills as 'Wolf' Larsen
Jane Keithley as Lorna Marsh 
Raymond Hackett as Allen Rand
Mitchell Harris as 'Death' Larsen
Nat Pendleton as Smoke
John Rogers as Mugridge
Harold Kinney as Leach
Sam Allen as Neilson
Harry Tenbrook as Axel Johnson

Bear of Oakland
The large barkentine rigged museum ship, Bear, moored in Oakland, starred as the sealer Macedonia in the film.

References

External links 

London, Jack, The Sea-Wolf, New York: Grosset & Dunlap, illustrated with stills from the 1930 film, on the Internet Archive

1930 films
1930s English-language films
Fox Film films
American drama films
1930 drama films
Films based on The Sea-Wolf
Films directed by Alfred Santell
American black-and-white films
Sea adventure films
1930s American films